The 2023 BYU Cougars softball team represents Brigham Young University in the 2023 NCAA Division I softball season.  Gordon Eakin enters the year as head coach of the Cougars for a 21st consecutive season. 2023 is the tenth and final season for the Cougars as members of the WCC in softball as they'll join the Big 12 Conference for the 2024 season. The Cougars enter 2023 having won their last 13 conference championships and having been picked as the favorites to win the 2023 WCC title.

2023 Roster

Schedule 

|-
! style=""| Puerto Vallarta College Challenge
|- 

|- align="center" bgcolor="ffbbb"
| February 9 || vs. North Carolina || – || Nancy Almaraz Field  || FloSoftball || 0–2 || Bailey McCachren (1–0) || Chloe Temples (0–1) || None || 184 || 0–1 || –
|- bgcolor="#ccffcc"
| February 9 || vs. Wisconsin || – || Nancy Almaraz Field || FloSoftball || 1–0 || Kaysen Korth (1–0) || Maddie Schwartz (0–1) || None || N/A || 1–1 || –
|- align="center" bgcolor="ffbbb"
| February 10 || vs. Maryland || – || Nancy Almaraz Field || FloSoftball || 2–10 (5) || Trinity Schlotterbeck (1–0) || Kaysen Korth (1–1) || None || 500 || 1–2 || –
|- bgcolor="#ccffcc"
| February 11 || vs. North Dakota State || – || Nancy Almaraz Field  || FloSoftball || 10–1 (5) || Chloe Temples (1–1) || Lainey Lyle (0–1) || None || 248 || 2–2 || –

|-
! style=""| Littlewood Classic
|- 

|- align="center" bgcolor="ccffccc"
| February 16 || at #22 Arizona State || – || Alberta B. Farrington Softball Stadium || P12 OR || 10–5 || Kaysen Korth (2–1) || Mac Osborne (1–2) || None || 1,213 || 3–2 || –
|- align="center" bgcolor="ccffcc"
| February 17 || vs. San Jose State || – || Alberta B. Farrington Softball Stadium ||  || 7–5 || Ailana Agbayani (1–0) || Olivia Grey (2–2) || None || 350 || 4–2 || –
|- align="center" bgcolor="#ccffcc"
| February 17 || vs. Oregon State || – || Alberta B. Farrington Softball Stadium ||  || 3–2 || Kaysen Korth (3–1) || Tarni Stepto (1–2) || None || 520 || 5–2 || –
|- align="center" bgcolor="#ccffcc"
| February 18 || vs. Illinois State || – || Alberta B. Farrington Softball Stadium ||  || 2–1 (8) || Chloe Temples (2–1) || Hannah Meshnick (1–1) || None || 308 || 6–2 || –
|- align="center" bgcolor="#ccffcc"
| February 18 || vs. DePaul || – || Alberta B. Farrington Softball Stadium ||  || 13–7 || Alyssa Aguilar (1–0) || Bella Nigey (2–2) || None || 412 || 7–2 || –
|-

|-
! style=""| Mary Nutter Collegiate Classic
|- 

|- align="center" bgcolor="ffbbb"
| February 23 || vs. #21 Missouri || – || Big League Dreams Complex || FloSoftball || 3–11 (5) || Jordan Weber (3–2) || Ailana Agbayani (1–1) || None || 286 || 7–3 || –
|- align="center" bgcolor="ffbbb"
| February 23 || vs. Texas A&M || – || Big League Dreams Complex || FloSoftball || 6–8 || Emiley Kennedy (3–0) || Kaysen Korth (3–2) || Shaylee Ackerman (1) || N/A || 7–4 || –
|- align="center" bgcolor="ffbbb"
| February 24 || vs. San Diego State || – || Big League Dreams Complex || FloSoftball || 1–4 || Sarah Lehman (4–0) || Chloe Temples (2–2) || Allie Light (4) || 108 || 7–5 || –
|- align="center" bgcolor="ccffcc"
| February 25 || vs. Long Beach State || – || Big League Dreams Complex || FloSoftball || 6–5 || Kaysen Korth (4–2) || Sophia Fernandez (0–2) || None || 264 || 8–5 || –
|-

|-
! style=""| Trailblazer Tournament
|- 

|- align="center" bgcolor="ffbbb"
| March 2 || vs. Oregon State || – || Karl Brooks Field || WAC DN || 4–7 || Sarah Haendiges (4–3) || Chloe Temples (2–3) || Ellie Garcia (2) || 109 || 8–6 || –
|- align="center" bgcolor="ccffcc"
| March 3 || vs. UNLV || – || Karl Brooks Field || WAC DN || 9–2 || Kaysen Korth (5–2) || Jessie Fontes (3–3) || None || 100 || 9–6 || –
|- align="center" bgcolor="#ccffcc"
| March 3 || vs. Portland State || – || Karl Brooks Field || WAC DN || 8–3 || Kaysen Korth (6–2) || Sherrei Nakoa-Chung (0–4) || None || 129 || 10–6 || –
|- align="center" 
| March 4 || vs. Idaho State || – || Karl Brooks Field || WAC DN ||  ||  ||  ||  ||  || – || –
|-

|-
! style=""| Regular Season
|- 

|- align="center" 
| March 15 || Utah || – || Gail Miller Field  || byutv.org ||  ||  ||  ||  ||  || – || – 
|-

|-
! style=""| Iowa State Invitational
|- 

|- align="center" 
| March 17 || at Iowa State || – || Cyclone Sports Complex  || ESPN+ || ||  ||  ||  ||  || – || –
|- align="center" 
| March 17 || at Iowa State || – || Cyclone Sports Stadium || ESPN+ ||  ||  ||  ||  ||  || – || –
|- align="center" 
| March 18 || vs. Omaha || – || Cyclone Sports Stadium  ||  ||  ||  ||  ||  ||  || – || – 
|- align="center" 
| March 18 || vs. Omaha || – || Cyclone Sports Stadium  ||   ||  ||  ||  ||  ||  || – || –
|-

|-
! style=""| Regular Season
|- 

|- align="center" 
| March 21 || Boise State || – || Gail Miller Field  || byutv.org ||  ||  ||  ||  ||  || – || – 
|- align="center" "
| March 23 || Utah State || – || Gail Miller Field  || byutv.org ||  ||  ||  ||  ||  || – || – 
|- align="center"
| March 25 || Idaho State || – || Gail Miller Field  || BYUtv ||  ||  ||  ||  ||  || – || –  
|- align="center" 
| March 25 || Idaho State || – || Gail Miller Field  || BYUtv ||  ||  ||  ||  ||  || – || –   
|- align="center"
| March 27 || at Utah Tech || – || Karl Brooks Field  || ESPN+ ||  ||  ||  ||  ||  || – || –  
|-

|-
! style=""| Purple & Gold Challenge
|- 

|- align="center" 
| March 30 || at LSU || – || Tiger Park  || SEC+ ||  ||  ||  ||  ||  || – || –  
|- align="center" 
| March 31 || vs. Louisiana Tech || – || Tiger Park  ||  ||  ||  ||  ||  ||  || – || –  
|- align="center" 
| March 31 || at LSU || – || Tiger Park  || SEC+ ||  ||  ||  ||  ||  || – || –  
|-

|- align="center" 
| April 1 || vs. NC State || – || Tiger Park  ||  ||  ||  ||  ||  ||  || – || – 
|-

|-
! style=""| Regular Season
|- 

|- align="center" 
| April 4 || at Idaho State || – || Miller Ranch Stadium  || ESPN+ ||  ||  ||  ||  ||  || – || – 
|- align="center" 
| April 7 || at Santa Clara* || – || SCU Softball Field  || WCC Net ||  ||  ||  ||  ||  || – || –
|- align="center" "
| April 7 || at Santa Clara* || – || SCU Softball Field  || WCC Net ||  ||  ||  ||  ||  || – || – 
|- align="center" "
| April 8 || at Santa Clara* || – || SCU Softball Field  || WCC Net ||  ||  ||  ||  ||  || – || –
|- align="center" 
| April 11 || Utah Valley || – || Gail Miller Field  || byutv.org ||  ||  ||  ||  ||  || – || –
|- align="center" 
| April 14 || at Loyola Marymount || – || Smith Field || WCC Net || ||  ||  ||  ||  || – || –
|- align="center" 
| April 15 || at Loyola Marymount* || – || Smith Field || WCC Net || ||  ||  ||  ||  || – || –
|- align="center" 
| April 15 || at Loyola Marymount* || – || Smith Field || WCC Net || ||  ||  ||  ||  || – || –
|- align="center" 
| April 17 || Stanford || – || Gail Miller Field  || byutv.org ||  ||  ||  ||  ||  || – || –
|- align="center" 
| April 19 || at Utah Valley || – || Wolverine Field || ESPN+ ||  ||  ||  ||  ||  || – || – 
|- align="center" 
| April 26 || Utah Tech || – || Gail Miller Field || byutv.org ||  ||  ||  ||  ||  || – || – 
|- align="center" 
| April 28 ||San Diego* || – || Gail Miller Field || byutv.org ||  ||  ||  ||  ||  || – || –  
|- align="center" 
| April 28 || San Diego* || – || Gail Miller Field  || byutv.org ||  ||  ||  ||  ||  || – || –  
|- align="center" 
| April 29 || Santa Clara* || – || Gail Miller Field  || byutv.org ||  ||  ||  ||  ||  || – || –  
|-

|- align="center" 
| May 1 || UCLA || – || Gail Miller Field  || BYUtv ||  ||  ||  ||  ||  || – || –  
|- align="center" 
| May 5 || Pacific* || – || Gail Miller Field  || byutv.org ||  ||  ||  ||  ||  || – || –  
|- align="center" 
| May 5 || Pacific* || – || Gail Miller Field  || byutv.org ||  ||  ||  ||  ||  || – || –  
|- align="center" 
| May 6 || Pacific* || – || Gail Miller Field  || BYUtv ||  ||  ||  ||  ||  || – || –    
|- align="center" 
| May 12 || at Saint Mary's* || – || Cottrell Field || WCC Net ||  ||  ||  ||  ||  || – || –
|- align="center" 
| May 13 || at Saint Mary's* || – || Cottrell Field || WCC Net ||  ||  ||  ||  ||  || – || –
|- align="center" 
| May 13 || at Saint Mary's* || – || Cottrell Field || WCC Net ||  ||  ||  ||  ||  || – || –
|-

| style="font-size:88%" | Rankings from NFCA. Parenthesis indicate tournament seedings.*West Coast Conference games

TV and Streaming Broadcast Information
North Carolina: Scott Sudikoff & KJ Sanchelli
Wisconsin: Scott Sudikoff & KJ Sanchelli
Maryland: Corey Brooks & Karen Johns
North Dakota State: Corey Brooks & Karen Johns
Arizona State: Cindy Brunson
Missouri: Chris Hooks & Joe Simmons 
Texas A&M: Chris Hooks & Joe Simmons 
San Diego State: Chris Hooks & Joe Simmons 
Long Beach State: Jill Guerin
Oregon State: No commentary
UNLV: No commentary
Portland State: No commentary
Idaho State: No commentary
Utah: 
Iowa State DH: 
Boise State: 
Utah State: 
Idaho State DH: 
Utah Tech: 
LSU: 
LSU: 
Idaho State:  
Santa Clara DH: 
Santa Clara: 
Utah Valley: 
Loyola Marymount: 
Loyola Marymount DH: 
Stanford: 
Utah Valley: 
Utah Tech: 
San Diego DH: 
San Diego: 
UCLA: 
Pacific DH: 
Pacific: 
Saint Mary's DH: 
Saint Mary's:

See also 
2022 BYU Cougars football team
2022–23 BYU Cougars men's basketball team
2022–23 BYU Cougars women's basketball team
2022 BYU Cougars women's soccer team
2022 BYU Cougars women's volleyball team
2023 BYU Cougars men's volleyball team
2023 BYU Cougars baseball team

External links 
 BYU Softball at byucougars.com

References 

2023 team
2023 in sports in Utah
BYU